Women Readers in French Painting 1870–1890: A Space for the Imagination is a 2012 book by Kathryn Brown, in which the author deals with the depiction of reading women in French art of the early Third Republic.

References

External links 
 Women Readers in French Painting 1870–1890

2012 non-fiction books
Books in art
19th century in France
French art
Art history books
Case studies
Theses
Ashgate Publishing books